"Ole Man Trouble" is a song written by Otis Redding and the first track from his 1965 album Otis Blue: Otis Redding Sings Soul. It was released as the B-side to his hit single "Respect", the second track from Otis Blue. The song is a sign of Redding's emerging mature and reflective side that was to culminate in his posthumous single "(Sittin' On) The Dock of the Bay". "Ole Man Trouble" was also released on Redding's posthumous album The Dock of the Bay.

As the "Dock of the Bay" represents a search for a place to settle down and find peace or a home, an old man is used as a personification for the trouble that can find a person after they have already endured it for some part of their life.

Crafted as a blues song with a classic soul melody set to country overtones, "Ole Man Trouble" helped Redding capture the growing white blues/soul market. The song was covered by a group called Hills Barbata Ethridge on their album L.A. Getaway in 1971, and by the Jon Spencer Blues Explosion.

Chart history

References

External links
[ Song review at Allmusic.com]

Otis Redding songs
Songs written by Otis Redding
1965 songs